Kitale Airport is an airport in Kitale, Kenya.

Location
Kitale Airport  is located in the town of Kitale, Trans-Nzoia County, in northwestern Kenya, close to the International border with the Republic of Uganda.  

The geographic coordinates of this airport are:0° 58' 30.00"N, 34° 57' 36.00"E (Latitude:0.975000; Longitude:34.960000).

Overview
Kitale Airport is a small airstrip commonly referred to as kambi miwa airstrip by the local people, the airstrip serves the town of Kitale and surrounding communities.

Airlines and destinations

See also
 Kenya Airports Authority
 Kenya Civil Aviation Authority
 List of airports in Kenya

References

External links
  Location of Kitale Airport At Google Maps
  Website of Kenya Airports Authority
  Airkenya Flight Routes
 

Airports in Kenya
Airports in Rift Valley Province
Trans-Nzoia County